The 1982 Maine gubernatorial election took place on November 2, 1982. Incumbent Democratic Governor Joseph Brennan, who defeated Georgette Berube for his party's nomination, defeated Republican challenger Charles R. Cragin, who defeated Sherry Huber for the Republican nomination.  Brennan defeated Cragin, winning his re-election by the most votes in the state's history, and the highest percent margin in more than thirty years.  The 281,066 votes received by Brennan represented the single highest vote total for governor in Maine history, until the re-election of Governor Janet Mills in 2022.

Results

Notes

Gubernatorial
1982
Maine